Hans Joachim Alpers (14 July 1943 – 16 February 2011) was a German writer and editor of science fiction and fantasy. Together with Werner Fuchs and Ulrich Kiesow he founded Fantasy Productions, which became one of the premier German RPG- and board game producers and retailers.  He was born in Bremerhaven.

As an editor he co-founded the highly successful German-language role-playing game The Dark Eye and the Science Fiction Times and as a critic he was a contributor to Science Fiction Studies. As a writer he used several pseudonyms including Jürgen Andreas, Thorn Forrester, Daniel Herbst, Gregory Kern, Mischa Morrison, P.T. Vieton, and Jörn de Vries. He won the Kurd-Laßwitz-Preis for the novels Das zerrissene Land and Die graue Eminenz. He also co-wrote a six-volume series of young-adult SF with Ronald M. Hahn Das Raumschiff der Kinder (translates as "The Children's Spaceship").

He edited anthologies, annual publications, and reference works. Anthologies included Science Fiction aus Deutschland: 24 Stories von 20 Autoren (1974). Annual publications included the Science-fiction-Almanach (1981–1987) and Science-fiction-Jahrbuch (1983–1987). Reference works included Reclams Science-fiction-Führer (1982), Lexikon der Science-fiction-Literatur (1980, 1988), Lexikon der Horrorliteratur (1999), and Lexikon der Fantasy-Literatur (2005).

He lived in Hamburg.

In 2012 he was awarded a posthumous special Kurd-Laßwitz-Preis for his many years of contributing to German-language SF.

Notes

External links
Interview with Hans Joachim Alpers (in German)
Obituary (in German)
Brief biography of Alpers from the publisher Pabel-Moewig
Entry for Alpers in the Katalog der Deutschen Nationalbibliothek (catalog of the German National Library)

1943 births
2011 deaths
German science fiction writers
German fantasy writers
German speculative fiction editors
Speculative
People from Bremerhaven
German male writers
Deutscher Fantasy Preis winners